The men's 4 x 100 metres relay event at the 2014 World Junior Championships in Athletics was held in Eugene, Oregon, USA, at Hayward Field on 25 and 26 July.

Medalists

Records

Results

Final
26 July
Start time: 17:35  Temperature: 31 °C  Humidity: 26 %

Heats
25 July
First 2 in each heat (Q) and the next 2 fastest (q) advance to the Final

Summary

Details
First 2 in each heat (Q) and the next 2 fastest (q) advance to the Final

Heat 1
26 July
Start time: 18:35  Temperature: 28 °C  Humidity: 33%

Heat 2
26 July
Start time: 18:50  Temperature: 28 °C  Humidity: 33%

Note:
IAAF Rule 170.7 - Passing the baton outside the takeover zone

Heat 3
26 July
Start time: 18:56  Temperature: 28 °C  Humidity: 33%

Note:
IAAF Rule 170.7 - Passing the baton outside the takeover zone

Participation
According to an unofficial count, 78 athletes from 18 countries participated in the event.

References

External links
 WJC14 4 x 100 metres reay schedule 

4 x 100 metres relay
Relays at the World Athletics U20 Championships